Aleksandar Tomašević (Serbian Cyrillic: Александар Томашевић; 19 November 1908 – 21 February 1988) was a Serbian football player and manager.

Playing career
Tomašević was one of the best forwards in the Belgrade clubs in the period before the World War II, the star player of BASK, national team striker and an excellent manager.
He started playing in 1925 in SK Jedinstvo Beograd. In 1928 moved to SK Soko and a year later the club was renamed into BASK where he'll stay for eleven years, until 1940, when because of a serious lesion of the meniscus, had to stop playing. He is remembered as an excellent technician and a very effective striker.

National team
Beside 23 matches for the Belgrade City selection, and one match for the Yugoslav B team, Tomašević played 12 matches for the Yugoslavia national football team having scored 8 goals. He mostly played as a striker or left midfielder. His debut was in Belgrade on 15 March 1931 against Greece (4-1 win) having scored a hat-trick. There was a darker period in his national team career that happened after in a match for the Balkan Cup, in Sofia against Bulgaria (2-3 loss), he failed to materialize a penalty and was afterward absent from the national side for three years! His comeback was in a Balkan Cup realized in Athens in 1935 and was a perfect opportunity for him to demonstrate the unfairness of his absence, having shown great condition and scored three goals in two matches that much helped his side to win the tournament, whereas Tomašević himself was the best scorer (along with Tirnanić with 3 goals each). His last match was on 22 May 1938 in a friendly match against Italy in Genoa (0-4 loss).

Managerial career
After his injury, Tomašević continued to be attached to football getting significant results as a football manager. He was the main coach of Sarajevo's FK Željezničar, Ljubljana's clubs Krim and Odred, Vardar Skopje and Partizan Belgrade but his main achievements were the two national cups with Red Star Belgrade, one national championship with Hajduk Split and winning the promotion to the First League with Radnički Beograd. He also spend some time coaching in Greece.

Honours
As player:
Yugoslavia
1 time Balkan Cup 1934-35 winner
1 time Balkan Cup 1934-35 top-scorer (equal with Tirnanić)

As manager:
1 time Yugoslav First League Champion: 1954-55 with Hajduk Split
2 times Yugoslav Cup winner: 1948-49 and 1949-50 with Red Star Belgrade

References

External links
Profile in Serbian Federation website

Footballers from Belgrade
Serbian footballers
Yugoslav footballers
Yugoslavia international footballers
Yugoslav First League players
SK Jedinstvo Beograd players
FK BASK players
Serbian football managers
Yugoslav football managers
Red Star Belgrade managers
FK Vardar managers
HNK Hajduk Split managers
FK Partizan managers
FK Sarajevo managers
Iraklis Thessaloniki F.C. managers
Association football forwards
Association football midfielders
1908 births
1988 deaths